Çördük can refer to:

 Çördük, Çerkeş
 Çördük, Taşköprü